Rekha Sharma is a Nepalese politician and incumbent Minister of Communication and ICT. Ms. Sharma is central committee member of Nepal Communist Party Maoist. She has been elected in the House of Representative from Dang-2 in the General Election 2022.  She has performed the duty of Chief Whip of the party in the Constituent Assembly of 2070 BS and also in the house of representative in 2074 BS.  She has served as the member of the 1st Federal Parliament of Nepal. In the 2017 Nepalese general election she was elected as a proportional representative from Khas Arya category.

References

Nepal MPs 2017–2022
Living people
Communist Party of Nepal (Maoist Centre) politicians
1969 births
Nepal MPs 2022–present
Members of the 2nd Nepalese Constituent Assembly